Paul Ranous Greever (September 28, 1891 – February 16, 1943) was a United States representative from Wyoming.

Born in Lansing, Kansas, he attended public and high schools, and was graduated from the law department of the University of Kansas in Lawrence in 1917. He served as a First Lieutenant in the Three Hundred and Fourteenth Trench Mortar Battery, 89th Division, from April 1917 to March 1919. He was admitted to the bar in 1917 and commenced practice in Pine Bluffs and in Cody, Wyoming in 1921. He served as mayor of Cody from 1930 to 1932, and was a trustee of the University of Wyoming from 1933 to 1934; he also engaged in banking.

Greever was elected as a member of the Democratic party to the Seventy-fourth and Seventy-fifth Congresses, serving from January 3, 1935 to January 3, 1939; he was an unsuccessful candidate for reelection in 1938 to the Seventy-sixth Congress. He resumed the practice of law, and in 1943 accidentally shot himself while cleaning a shotgun. He died in Cody; interment was in Riverside Cemetery.

See also

References
 Retrieved on 2009-02-24

External links
 The Paul Ranous Greever papers at the American Heritage Center

 

1891 births
1943 deaths
People from Leavenworth County, Kansas
Democratic Party members of the United States House of Representatives from Wyoming
Mayors of places in Wyoming
Wyoming lawyers
People from Park County, Wyoming
20th-century American politicians
20th-century American lawyers
University of Kansas alumni
United States Army officers
United States Army personnel of World War I
Firearm accident victims in the United States
Accidental deaths in Wyoming
Deaths by firearm in Wyoming